Events from the year 1971 in the United Kingdom. The year was marked by the introduction of decimal currency.

Incumbents
 Monarch – Elizabeth II
 Prime Minister – Edward Heath (Conservative)
 Parliament – 45th

Events

January
 1 January – The Divorce Reform Act 1969 came into effect, allowing couples to divorce after a separation of two years (five if only one of them agrees). A divorce can also be granted on the grounds that the marriage has irretrievably broken down, and it is not essential for either partner to prove "fault". It was revealed on 19 January 1972 that the number of divorces in Britain during 1971 exceeded 100,000 for the first time.
 2 January – Ibrox disaster: a stairway crush at the Rangers vs. Celtic football match at Ibrox Stadium in Glasgow killed 66 and left many more injured.
 3 January – BBC Open University broadcasts began.
 8 January – Tupamaros kidnapped Geoffrey Jackson, British ambassador to Uruguay, in Montevideo; they kept him captive until September.
 12 January – The Hertfordshire house of Robert Carr, Secretary of State for Employment, was bombed. Nobody was injured.
 14 January – "The Angry Brigade", an extremist group, admitted responsibility for the bombing of Robert Carr's house, as well as planting a bomb at the Department of Employment offices at Westminster.
 20 January – The first ever postal workers' strike took place, led by UPW General Secretary Tom Jackson, in an attempt to win a 19.5% pay rise.
 21 January – After collapsing in March 1969, a newly reconstructed Emley Moor transmitter in West Yorkshire started transmitting again. Now a concrete tower, at 1084 feet (330.4m), it is Britain's tallest freestanding structure.
 23 January – The first Commonwealth Heads of Government Meeting, in Singapore, gave Britain permission to sell weapons to South Africa.

February
 1 February – The Broadcast receiver licence was abolished for radios and stamp duty abolished on cheques, receipts and promissory notes.
 3 February – Tyneside-set British crime film Get Carter starring Michael Caine premièred (in Los Angeles).
 4 February – Rolls-Royce went bankrupt and was nationalised.
 11 February – The UKalong with the USA, the USSR and otherssigned the Seabed Treaty, outlawing nuclear weapons on the ocean floor.
 15 February 
Decimalisation: Decimal Day: the UK and the Republic of Ireland both switched to decimal currency.
 Enoch Powell predicted an "explosion" unless there was a massive repatriation scheme for the immigrants.
 24 February – Home Secretary Reginald Maudling announced the Immigration Bill that was set to strip Commonwealth immigrants of their right to remain in the United Kingdom. The bill was supported by Enoch Powell, but the former shadow cabinet minister continued to demand a massive voluntary repatriation scheme for the immigrants.

March
 1 March – An estimated 120,000 to 250,000 "kill the bill" protesters went on strike against the 1971 Industrial Relations Act in London.
 7 March – Following the recent protests in London, some 10,000 striking workers protested in Glasgow against the Industrial Relations Bill.
 8 March – The postal workers' strike ended after 47 days.

April
 1 April – The United Kingdom lifted all restrictions on gold ownership with the Exchange Control (Gold Coins Exemption) Order 1971. Since 1966 British citizens had been banned from holding more than four gold coins or from buying any new ones unless they held a licence.
 11 April – Ten British Army soldiers were injured in rioting in Derry, Northern Ireland.
 15 April – The planned Barbican Centre in London was given the go-ahead.
 18 April – There was a serious fire at Kentish Town West railway station. The station remained closed until 5 October 1981.
 19 April – Unemployment reached a post-Second World War high of nearly 815,000.
 27 April
 Eight members of the Welsh Language Society went on trial for destroying English language road signs in Wales.
 British Leyland launched the Morris Marina which succeeded the Minor (a smaller model, production of which ceased after 23 years with 1.6 million sold) and Oxford models and was similar in size to the Ford Cortina (to which it had been designed as a direct competitor), Vauxhall Victor and Hillman Hunter. It has 1.3 and 1.8 litre petrol engines, rear-wheel drive and a choice of four-door family saloon and two-door coupé body styles, with a five-door estate set to follow in the next two years.

May
 1 May
 A bomb planted by the Angry Brigade exploded in the Biba Kensington store.
 The Daily Mail appeared as a broadsheet newspaper for the last time, being relaunched the following day as a tabloid.
 8 May – Arsenal won the FA Cup final with a 2–1 win over Liverpool at Wembley Stadium. Eddie Kelly became the first substitute to score in an FA Cup final, and it was only the second time this century (and the fourth time ever) that an English team has completed the double of the Football League First Division and the FA Cup.
 11 May – The Daily Sketch, Britain's oldest tabloid newspaper, was withdrawn from circulation after 62 years and absorbed by the Daily Mail.
 20 May – Chelsea F.C., last year's FA Cup winners, won the European Cup Winners' Cup with a 2–1 win over Real Madrid of Spain in Athens, Greece.
 23 May – Jackie Stewart won the Monaco Grand Prix.

June
 7 June – The children's show Blue Peter buried a time capsule in the grounds of BBC Television Centre, due to be opened on the first episode of the year 2000.
 14 June
 The first Hard Rock Cafe opened near Hyde Park Corner in London.
 Education Secretary Margaret Thatcher's proposals to end free school milk for children aged over seven years were backed by a majority of 33 MPs.
 15 June
 Several Labour run councils threatened to increase rates in order to continue the free supply of milk to school children aged over seven years, in reaction to Thatcher's plans to end free milk supply to school children of that age group. Thatcher defends her plans, saying that the change will free more money to be spent on the construction of new school buildings.
 Upper Clyde Shipbuilders entered liquidation.
 20 June – Britain announced that Soviet space scientist Anatoli Fedoseyev had been granted asylum.
 21 June – Britain began new negotiations for EEC membership in Luxembourg.
 24 June – The EEC agreed terms for Britain's proposed membership and it was hoped that the nation will join the EEC next year.
 25–27 June – The first Reading Festival "of jazz and progressive music" took place.

July
 1 July – The film Sunday Bloody Sunday was released, one of the first mainstream British films with a bisexual theme.
 6 July – Police launched a murder investigation after three French tourists were found shot dead in Cheshire.
 8 July – Two rioters were shot dead by British troops in Derry, Northern Ireland.
 13 July – Barlaston man Michael Bassett, 24, was found dead in his fume-filled car. Police identified him as their prime suspect in the recent triple French tourist murder in Cheshire.
 14 July – The Criminal Damage Act abolished the – theoretically capital – offence of arson in royal dockyards.
 22 July – A BOAC flight from London to Khartoum is ordered to land at Benghazi (Libya) where two leaders of the unsuccessful 1971 Sudanese coup d'état, travelling as passengers, are forced to leave the plane and subsequently executed.
 23 July – The final section of London Underground's Victoria line, from Victoria to Brixton, was opened by Princess Alexandra.
 29 July – The United Kingdom opted out of the Space Race, with the cancellation of development on its Black Arrow launch vehicle.
 30 July – Upper Clyde Shipbuilders workers began to take control of the shipyards in a work-in under the leadership of Jimmy Reid.

August
 6 August – Chay Blyth became the first person to sail around the world east to west against the prevailing winds.
 9 August – British security forces in Northern Ireland detained hundreds of guerrilla suspects and put them into Long Kesh prison – the beginning of an internment without trial policy. Twenty died in the riots that followed, including 11 in the Ballymurphy Massacre.
 10 August – Mr. Tickle, the first book in the Mr. Men series is first published.
 11 August – Prime Minister Edward Heath participated in the British victory in the Admiral's Cup yacht race.
 14 August – The Who released their critically acclaimed album Who's Next.
 15 August – Showjumper Harvey Smith was stripped of his victory in the British Show Jumping Derby by judges for making a V sign.

September
 1 September – The pre-decimal penny and threepence ceased to be legal tender.
 3 September – Qatar gained independence from the United Kingdom. Unlike most nearby emirates, it declined to become part of either the United Arab Emirates or Saudi Arabia.
 7 September – The death toll in the Troubles of Northern Ireland reached 100 after three years with the death of 14-year-old Annette McGavigan, who was fatally wounded by a gunshot in crossfire between British soldiers and the IRA.
 9 September – British ambassador Geoffrey Jackson was freed after being held captive for eight months by extreme left-wing guerrillas in Uruguay.
 21 September – Television music show The Old Grey Whistle Test was aired for the first time on BBC 2.
 24 September – Operation FOOT: Britain expelled 90 Soviet Union intelligence officers operating under diplomatic cover for spying, partly prompted by revelations made by KGB defector Oleg Lyalin earlier in the year; a further 15 staff on leave in the USSR were not allowed to return to the UK.

October
 1 October – Godfrey Hounsfield's invention, the CAT scan, was used for the first time on a hospital patient, in Wimbledon.
 13 October – The British Army began destroying roads between the Republic of Ireland and Northern Ireland as a security measure.
 21 October
 A gas explosion in the town centre of Clarkston, East Renfrewshire, killed 20 people.
 The television drama Edna, the Inebriate Woman was shown on BBC One.
 23 October – Two women were shot dead by soldiers in Belfast as their car failed to stop at a checkpoint.
 28 October:
 The House of Commons voted in favour of joining the EEC by a vote of 356-244.
 Immigration Act 1971 restricted immigration, particularly primary immigration into the U.K., and introduced the status of right of abode into U.K. law.
 The United Kingdom became the sixth nation successfully to launch a satellite into orbit using its own launch vehicle, the Prospero (X-3) experimental communications satellite (built at the Royal Aircraft Establishment, Farnborough), using a Black Arrow carrier rocket from Woomera Launch Area 5 in South Australia.
 30 October – The Democratic Unionist Party was founded by the Rev. Ian Paisley in Northern Ireland.
 31 October – A bomb, probably planted by the Angry Brigade, exploded at the top of the Post Office Tower in London.

November
Erin Pizzey established the world's first domestic violence shelter in Chiswick, London.
 10 November – The 10-route Spaghetti Junction motorway interchange was opened north of Birmingham city centre, incorporating the A38(M) (Aston Expressway) and the southern section of the M6 motorway. The interchange would have a total of 12 routes when the final stretch of the M6 was opened the following year.
 22 November – Cairngorm Plateau disaster: Five children and one adult on an expedition die of exposure in the Scottish Highlands.

December
 2 December – The Queen's yearly allowance was increased from £475,000 to £980,000.
 4 December – McGurk's Bar bombing: Fifteen people were killed and 17 injured in a bomb attack that destroyed a bar in Belfast, the highest death toll from a single incident in the city during "The Troubles". The Ulster Volunteer Force is believed to have been behind the bombing.
 10 December – Dennis Gabor won the Nobel Prize in Physics "for his invention and development of the holographic method".
 16 December
 Banking and Financial Dealings Act passed, updating the definition of bank holidays in the U.K.
 Trial of the Mangrove Nine, a group of black activists, concluded with them being acquitted of the most serious charge (incitement to riot at a 1970 protest against police targeting of The Mangrove, a London Caribbean restaurant) and judicial acknowledgement of behaviour motivated by racial hatred within the Metropolitan Police.
 29 December – The United Kingdom gave up its military bases in Malta.
 30 December – The seventh James Bond film – Diamonds Are Forever – was released. Sean Connery, who appeared in the first five films before being succeeded by George Lazenby for On Her Majesty's Secret Service in 1969, returned to the role for one final appearance in the official series of films.

Undated
 Inflation stood at a 30-year high of 8.6%.
 The government introduced a policy of Competition and Credit Control, lifting quantitative limits on lending by retail banks and allowing them greater freedom to offer savings accounts.
 The government imposed a rent freeze.
 David Hockney's acrylic painting Mr and Mrs Clark and Percy was completed.
 Oil overtook coal as the most consumed fuel in Britain for the first time.
 Vectis postal service is set up during the national postal strike.

Publications
 Gerda Charles's novel The Destiny Waltz (winner of the first Whitbread Award for fiction).
 Agatha Christie's last-written Miss Marple mystery Nemesis.
 E. M. Forster's novel Maurice (completed 1914 and published posthumously).
 Frederick Forsyth's thriller The Day of the Jackal.
 Roger Hargreaves' children's book Mr. Tickle, first of the Mr. Men series.
 Spike Milligan's comic autobiography Adolf Hitler: My Part in His Downfall.
 V. S. Naipaul's novel In a Free State.
 Terry Pratchett's comic fantasy novel The Carpet People.
 Paul Scott's novel The Towers of Silence, third of the Raj Quartet.
 Keith Thomas' study Religion and the Decline of Magic: studies in popular beliefs in sixteenth and seventeenth century England.

Births

January – March
 January – Katharine Viner, editor-in-chief, The Guardian
 1 January – Andre Marriner, football referee
 5 January 
Sarah Kane, playwright (d. 1999)
Jayne Middlemiss, television presenter
 7 January – Joanne Malin, television presenter
 12 January – Jay Burridge, artist and television presenter
 15 January – Lara Cazalet, British actress
 20 January – Gary Barlow, singer
 21 January – Alan McManus, Scottish snooker player
 23 January 
Scott Gibbs, rugby player and sportscaster
Lisa Snowdon, English television and radio presenter and fashion model
 29 January – Clare Balding, broadcaster, journalist and author
 30 January – Darren Boyd, actor
 31 January – Patrick Kielty, Northern Irish comedian and television presenter
 2 February – Michelle Gayle, singer and actress
 3 February – Sarah Kane, English playwright (died 1999)
 13 February – Sonia, English pop singer
 16 February – Amanda Holden, actress
 16 February – Steven Houghton, actor and singer
 23 February – Melinda Messenger, television presenter and model
 24 February – Nicky Hambleton-Jones, television presenter and fashion expert
 1 March – Thomas Adès, English classical composer, pianist and conductor
 3 March – Charlie Brooker, English satirist
 6 March 
 Claire Baker, Scottish politician
 Geraldine O'Rawe, Northern Irish actress
 7 March – Rachel Weisz, actress
 13 March – Joey Beauchamp, footballer (died 2022)
 23 March
 Kate Dickie, Scottish actress
 Gail Porter, television presenter.
 27 March – David Coulthard, Scottish racing driver
 31 March 
Paul Grayson, Yorkshire cricketer
Ewan McGregor, Scottish actor

April – June
 2 April – Jason Lewry, cricketer
 3 April – Douglas Carswell, Conservative politician and MP for Harwich
 11 April – John Leech, Liberal Democrat politician, shadow transport spokesperson, and MP for Manchester Withington
 15 April – Kate Harbour, voice actress
 16 April – Belinda Stewart-Wilson, actress
 18 April 
 Samantha Cameron, businesswoman
 David Tennant, Scottish actor
 24 April – Adrian Simpson, television presenter
 9 May 
Jason Lee, footballer and manager
Paul McGuigan, musician and a founding member of Oasis
 17 May – Vernie Bennett, singer (Eternal)
 23 May – George Osborne, Conservative politician, Chancellor of the Exchequer, and MP for Tatton
 24 May – Emily Hamilton, actress
 27 May 
Paul Bettany, actor
Lee Sharpe, footballer
 3 June – Julian Sturdy, politician
 5 June – Susan Lynch, Northern Irish actress
 11 June – Liz Kendall, English politician
 20 June – Brandon Lewis, English lawyer and politician
 22 June – Gary Connolly, English rugby player
 25 June 
 Neil Lennon, Northern Irish footballer
 Scott Maslen, English actor
 28 June – Sean Dyche, English football player and manager

July – September

 1 July – Rosie Duffield, English politician
 14 July – Howard Webb, English football referee
 2 August 
 Alice Evans, actress
 Michael Hughes, Northern Irish footballer
 9 August – Kate Gerbeau, television presenter and newsreader
 18 August - Aphex Twin (Richard D. James), Irish-born electronic music artist
 21 August – Liam Howlett, musician
 26 August – Gaynor Faye, actress
 29 August – Nicola Mendelsohn, business executive
 31 August – Kirstie Allsopp, television presenter
 1 September – Daniel Hannan, British Conservative politician, MEP for South East England
 8 September – Martin Freeman, actor
 11 September – Richard Ashcroft, English musician and singer (The Verve)
 13 September
 Louise Lombard, actress.
 Stella McCartney, fashion designer
 17 September – Parmjit Dhanda, British Labour politician, MP for Gloucester
 22 September – Chesney Hawkes, English singer-songwriter
 24 September – Es Devlin, set designer
 25 September – Jessie Wallace, actress
 28 September – Liza Walker, actress
 29 September – Mackenzie Crook, English actor

October – December
 8 October – David Gauke, Lord Chancellor
 13 October – Sacha Baron Cohen, British comedian
 14 October – Andy Cole, English footballer
 16 October – Craig Phillips, British reality show star, winner of Big Brother UK in 2000
 21 October – Jade Jagger, jewellery designer
 29 October – Lee Mason, football referee
 30 October – John Alford, British actor and singer
 3 November – Alison Williamson, archer
 8 November – Michael Jeffrey, English footballer
 17 November – Michael Adams, chess player
 18 November – Thérèse Coffey, politician
 22 November
 Cath Bishop, British rower and Olympic medallist
 Kyran Bracken, Irish-born rugby union footballer
 1 December – Emily Mortimer, actress
 5 December – Ashia Hansen, triple jumper
 7 December – DeObia Oparei, actor 
 14 December – Lucie Stewart, British actress
 10 December – Daniel Betts, actor
 23 December – Tara Palmer-Tomkinson, British socialite and television presenter (died 2017)
 25 December – Dido, English pop singer
 27 December – Duncan Ferguson, football player and manager

Deaths

January – March
 12 January – John Tovey, British admiral of the fleet (born 1885)
 24 January – St. John Greer Ervine, Northern Irish dramatist and author (born 1883)
 28 January – Donald Winnicott, British psychoanalyst (born 1896)
 6 March – Thurston Dart, English harpsichordist and conductor (born 1921)
 7 March – Stevie Smith, English poet (born 1902)
 16 March – Bebe Daniels, American-born actress (born 1901)

April – June
 20 April – Cecil Parker, English film actor (born 1897)
 1 May – Violet Jessop, survivor of the sinking of the RMS Titanic (born 1887)
 15 May – Sir Tyrone Guthrie, English theatre director, producer and writer (born 1900)
 20 May – Waldo Williams, Welsh language poet (born 1904)
 6 June – Edward Andrade, English poet and physicist (born 1887)
 10 June – Michael Rennie, English actor (born 1909)
 25 June – John Boyd Orr, Scottish physician and biologist, recipient of the Nobel Peace Prize (born 1880)

July – September
 1 July
 William Lawrence Bragg, English physicist, Nobel Prize laureate (born 1890)
 Learie Constantine, cricketer (born 1901 in Trinidad)
 4 July – Maurice Bowra, writer, critic and Vice-Chancellor of Oxford University (1951–1954) (born 1898 in China)
 19 July – John Jacob Astor, 1st Baron Astor of Hever, businessman (born 1886 in the United States)
 27 July – Charlie Tully, Northern Irish footballer (born 1924)
 30 August – Peter Fleming, travel writer and brother of Ian Fleming (born 1907)

October – December
 11 November – A. P. Herbert, politician and writer (born 1890)
 17 November – Gladys Cooper, actress (born 1888)
 12 December
 Torry Gillick, Rangers winger (born 1915)
 Alan Morton, Rangers outside left (born 1893)
 21 December – Charles C. Banks, pilot (born 1893)

See also
 1971 in British music
 1971 in British television
 List of British films of 1971

References

 
Years of the 20th century in the United Kingdom